Ortaköy is a neighborhood of Çifteler district in Eskişehir Province, Turkey.

Geography 
It is 97km from Eskişehir city.

Population

References 

Neighbourhoods in Turkey
Populated places in Eskişehir Province